Let's Go is a 1923 American silent action film directed by William K. Howard and starring Richard Talmadge, Eileen Percy, and Tully Marshall.

Plot

Cast

Preservation
A incomplete print of Let's Go with one reel missing is held in the George Eastman Museum Motion Picture Collection.

References

Bibliography
 Munden, Kenneth White. The American Film Institute Catalog of Motion Pictures Produced in the United States, Part 1. University of California Press, 1997.

External links

1923 films
1920s action films
American silent feature films
American action films
Films directed by William K. Howard
American black-and-white films
1920s English-language films
1920s American films
Silent action films